"A Matter of Trust" is a song by Billy Joel, released in 1986 as the second single from his album The Bridge.

The song was the second top 10 single from the album, after "Modern Woman". The song gained major traction in the Soviet Union as part of a state-sponsored television promotion of Joel's songs in preparation for his 1987 USSR concerts, recorded on Kontsert.

Music video 
The song's music video, directed by Russell Mulcahy and conceived and produced by Paul Flattery, features Joel and his band performing in the basement of a building in St. Mark's Place in New York City's East Village, and also features shots of various people in the city who eventually gather 'round the building's windows to see Joel perform. Most appear to be enjoying the performance except one woman on a fire escape who yells at them to "shut up!" However, she is ignored, and even members of the NYPD do not mind. Joel's then-wife Christie Brinkley appears in the video holding their baby daughter Alexa. The song differs from most Joel songs in that it is based on electric guitar rather than piano, which gives it a rock edge, compared to the soft-rock balladry with which he is more often associated. It is the only Joel music video that features him on guitar—a factor he cited when saying it was his favorite of all his videos.

Reception
Billboard called it "refreshingly untidy rock" with "elegant song structure".  Cash Box said that "This generic sounding pop tune may not be one of Joel’s best, but with his gut level vocal and the heavy rock guitar backing featured within it, the tune is given a cutting edge."

Legacy 
During the 2020 presidential cycle and COVID-19 pandemic, CNN broadcast commercials promoting the importance of trust and which featured "A Matter of Trust" as background music. CNN states in an email: "This version's stripped-down instrumentals set against the black and white images create space to pause and reflect on this year's chaotic news cycles, and offer hope for how we can grow better together from these unprecedented times."

Charts

Weekly charts

Year-end charts

References

1986 singles
Billy Joel songs
Songs written by Billy Joel
Song recordings produced by Phil Ramone
Columbia Records singles
Music videos directed by Russell Mulcahy
1985 songs